Branko Žutić (1932 – 2003) was a Yugoslavian football coach active in Africa. He managed the Cameroon national team between 1980 and 1982.

References

1932 births
2003 deaths
Yugoslav football managers
Cameroon national football team managers
Yugoslav expatriate football managers
Yugoslav expatriate sportspeople in Cameroon
Expatriate football managers in Cameroon
Expatriate football managers in Ghana
Expatriate football managers in Nigeria
Expatriate football managers in Togo
Serbian expatriate sportspeople in Ghana
1982 African Cup of Nations managers